This is a list of the Mayors of Manly Council, a former local government area of New South Wales, Australia. The official title of Mayors while holding office was: His/Her Worship The Mayor of Manly. First incorporated on 6 January 1877 as the Municipality of Manly, the council met for the first time on 15 February 1877, when the first mayor was elected. The council became known as Manly Council on 1 July 1993 following the enactment of the Local Government Act, 1993 which also stipulated that the term 'Town Clerk' be replaced with 'General Manager' and 'Alderman' be replaced by 'Councillor'. Originally a role nominated by the council annually, from 1995 until abolition in 2016 it was directly elected every four years. The last Mayor of Manly was Councillor Jean Hay (Liberal), elected on 8 September 2008.

Mayors

Town Clerks/General Managers

References

External links
Manly Council (Archived)

Manly
Mayors of Manly
Mayors Manly
Manly, New South Wales